Herr's is an American brand of potato chips and other snack foods produced and marketed by eponymous private American company Herr Foods Inc. based in Nottingham, Pennsylvania. While their products are sold primarily throughout the Eastern United States and Canada, their stronghold is the Mid-Atlantic region. Herr's products are sold in all 50 American states and in over 40 countries.

History
In 1946, Jim Herr, then 21 years old, purchased a small potato chip company in Lancaster, Pennsylvania. Initial sales averaged approximately thirty dollars a week ($ today, adjusted for inflation).

In 1958, the company introduced flavored potato chips, and in 1974, switched to foil packaging from the traditional glassine bags. The 1970s and 1980s saw a growth in the snack food industry which prompted an expansion in the variety of products being manufactured, including corn chips, tortilla chips, and pretzels.  The 1980s also saw the addition of the Herr Angus Farm, a cattle farm which made use of potato waste products. 

Jim Herr began transferring control of the company to his sons, Ed Herr and J. M. Herr, in the 1990s, with Ed taking over as company spokesman. Jim Herr retired as company chair in favor of J. M. Herr in January 2005, but remained on the board of directors until his death. Jim Herr died on April 5, 2012, at the age of 87. Ed Herr and J. M. Herr assumed the roles of president and executive chairman respectively.

Products
Herr's produces a wide variety of snack foods, including potato chips, pretzels, tortilla chips, cheese curls, popcorn, and onion rings. They produce, as of July 2016, 37 different potato chip varieties, with an emphasis on strong and spicy flavors. Among their offerings are Ragin Ranch, Buffalo Blue Cheese, Old Bay, Horseradish, Baby Back Ribs, Kansas City Steak, Hot Sauce, Jalapeño, in addition to more traditional varieties such as Barbecue, Kettle Cooked, Sour Cream & Onion, Cheddar & Sour Cream, Salt & Pepper, Ketchup, Habanero and Creamy Ranch, and Salt & Vinegar.

In January 2016, Herr's released a picture on social media previewing a new Crab Fries flavored potato chips in partnership with Chickie's & Pete's, a sports bar also headquartered in the Philadelphia region. Herr's planned to release the chips to stores a couple of months after the announcement, however the chips were instead released one month later in February due to popular demand. Herr's has also released a BBQ chips line in partnership with Stubbs BBQ sauce.

Herr's potato chips are sold in distinctive foil packaging.

In popular culture

A subplot of an episode of The Office features Jim Halpert and Karen Filippelli spending the workday searching for a package of Herr's salt and vinegar chips. In a DVD exclusive for season 3, Kevin Malone makes a quesadilla out of Herr's chips and Cheez Whiz.

Visitors' center

The Herr's Visitors' Center was constructed in 1989 and is adjacent to the plant in Nottingham, Pennsylvania. Tour guides lead visitors through both the visitors' center and the actual plant. The tours last approximately one hour.

References

External links

Official website

Brand name snack foods
Brand name potato chips and crisps
Snack food manufacturers of the United States
American companies established in 1946
Companies based in Chester County, Pennsylvania
1946 establishments in Pennsylvania
Food and drink companies established in 1946
Snack food manufacturers of Pennsylvania
Tourist attractions in Chester County, Pennsylvania